Ortachne is a genus of Latin American plants in the grass family.

 Species
 Ortachne breviseta Hitchc. - Chile, Argentina

 Ortachne rariflora (Hook.f.) Hughes - Chile, Argentina

 formerly included
see Aristida 
 Ortachne floridana - Aristida floridana
 Ortachne pilosa - Aristida jorullensis
 Ortachne scabra - Aristida ternipes
 Ortachne tenuis - Aristida ternipes
 Ortachne erectifolia (Swallen) Clayton  - Lorenzochloa erectifolia

References

Pooideae
Poaceae genera